Terinos taxiles is a butterfly in the family Nymphalidae. It was described by William Chapman Hewitson in 1862. It is found in the Australasian realm.

Subspecies
T. t. taxiles (Celebes, Bachan)
T. t. abisares C. & R. Felder, [1867] (Celebes)
T. t. poros Fruhstorfer, 1906 (South Sulawesi)
T. t. helleri Fruhstorfer, 1906 (Waigeu)
T. t. amplior Fruhstorfer, 1906 (Halmahera)
T. t. banggaiensis Detani, 1983 (Banggai)
T. t. angurium Tsukada, 1985 (Sula: Sanana)

Biology
The larva on feeds on Rinorea.

References

External links
Terinos at Markku Savela's Lepidoptera and Some Other Life Forms

Terinos
Butterflies described in 1862